Events from the year 1943 in Denmark.

Incumbents
 Monarch – Christian X
 Prime minister – Erik Scavenius (until 29 September), German military rule

Events
 29 April – Some 100 prominent Danes are taken hostage by the occupying German forces in the attempt to stop sabotage by the Danish resistance movement.
 29 August – The Danish government resigns, leading to direct administration of Denmark by German authority.
 28 September – Georg Ferdinand Duckwitz, a German diplomat, after secretly making sure Sweden would receive Jewish refugees, leaks word of the German plans for the arrest and deportation of the some 8,000 Danish Jews to Hans Hedtoft, chairman of the Danish Social Democratic Party. The result is the rescue of the Danish Jews, with most of the country's Jews escaping to Sweden.

Sports
 AB wins their fourth Danish football championship by winning the 1942–43 Danish War Tournament.

Births
 27 March – Jørgen Hansen, welterweight boxer (died 2018)
 16 April – Erling Kroner, jazz trombonist, composer and bandleader (died 2011)
 13 May – Kurt Trampedach, painter (died 2013)
 17 May  Jette Nevers, textile artist
 24 May – Svend Auken, politician (died 2009)
 15 June – Poul Nyrup Rasmussen, politician, former Danish Prime Minister, President of PES
 13 August  Margrethe Agger, textile artist

Deaths
 24 February – Thomas Madsen-Mygdal, farmer, politician, Prime Minister of Denmark 1926–29 (born 1876)
 15 March – Betty Nansen, actress and theatre director (born 1873)
 21 May – Ivar Bentsen, architect (born 1876)
 27 June – Knud Arne Petersen, architect and artistic director (born 1862)
 21 August – Henrik Pontoppidan, Nobel Prize-winning writer (born 1857)
 30 November – Holger-Madsen, actor (born 1878)

References

 
Denmark
Years of the 20th century in Denmark
1940s in Denmark
1943 in Europe